Battle of Kreminna may refer to:

 First Battle of Kreminna, April 2022
 Battle of the Svatove–Kreminna line, October 2022